Social Security (Seafarers) Convention, 1946 is  an International Labour Organization Convention.

It was established in 1946, with the preamble stating:
Having decided upon the adoption of certain proposals with regard to social security for seafarers,...

Ratifications 
The convention was ratified by seven states. It never came into force because the criteria set out in the convention were not met.

Revision
The convention was revised into and superseded by Social Security (Seafarers) Convention (Revised), 1987.

External links 
Text.
Ratifications.

International Labour Organization conventions
Social security
Treaties concluded in 1946
Treaties not entered into force
Admiralty law treaties
1946 in labor relations